Kim Dong-hee (born June 13, 1999) is a South Korean actor under NPIO Entertainment. He is best known for his acting in hit Korean television series such as Sky Castle (2019), Itaewon Class  (2020), A-Teen (2018), A-Teen 2 (2019), and Netflix's original series Extracurricular (2020).

Early life
Kim was born on June 13, 1999, in Andong and is currently studying at Gachon University majoring in Acting Arts.

Career
Kim made his acting debut in 2018, playing as Ha Min-in the teen web series, A-Teen. He also starred in JTBC's hit drama Sky Castle which started airing on November 23, 2018. Kim reprised his role as Ha Min-in the second season of A-Teen which aired in 2019.

In 2020, Kim starred in JTBC's drama Itaewon Class, based on the webtoon of the same name. Kim then landed his first lead role in the Netflix television series Extracurricular where he played the role of a school boy named Oh Ji-soo.

Personal life

Bullying allegations and investigation 
In February 2021, Mr. A claimed to be Kim Dong-hee's elementary school classmate, said, "It was a daily routine for Kim Dong-hee to hit and bully his friends", and has been posted Mr. A presented Kim Dong-hee's graduation photo and SNS photos along with the revelations. Netizen B, who claimed to be Kim Dong-hee's middle school classmate, also claimed, "Kim Dong-hee slapped a classmate who was suffering from a disability with a game that was unfavorable to him or called in a friend to give him a massage." Netizen B also said, "I was strangled by Kim Dong-hee for minor reasons and assaulted several times, and I even received death threats with a sharp weapon."

On December 28, 2021 Kim Dong-hee's legal representative, said in an official statement that the investigation into defamation caused by the spread of false information raised to the author of the allegation of school violence was acquitted. The result of the investigation came out, Kim Dong-hee is innocent.

On January 12, 2022 the Seoul Metropolitan Police has revealed that Kim Dong-hee has admitted to bullying one of his classmates in high-school.

Kim Dong-Hee and the company he is under, JYP Entertainment, has yet to release a statement and apology regarding the matter.

On January 13, 2022 Kim Dong-hee revealed his position and posted a apology on the suspicion of school violence. He stated:

Filmography

Film

Television series

Web series

Awards and nominations

References

External links
 
 
 

1999 births
Living people
South Korean male models
South Korean male television actors
South Korean television presenters
South Korean male web series actors
21st-century South Korean male actors
JYP Entertainment artists
People from Andong
Gachon University alumni